Garethjonesia is a genus of fungi in the Sordariomycetes class (subclass Sordariomycetidae) of the Ascomycota. The relationship of this taxon to other taxa within the class is unknown (incertae sedis), and it has not yet been placed with certainty into any order or family. This is a monotypic genus, containing the single species Garethjonesia lacunosispora.

References

External links
Index Fungorum

Sordariomycetes enigmatic taxa
Monotypic Sordariomycetes genera